Glooston is a small village and civil parish in the Harborough district of Leicestershire, England. According to the 2001 census the parish had a population of 54, increasing to 147 (including Cranoe and Stonton Wyville) at the 2011 census.

The village's name means 'farm/settlement of Glor'.

The settlement of Glooston lies around a crossroads in the centre of the parish. There are several 17th and 18th century brick-built houses, and a terrace of early 19th century stone-built cottages. The Roman Gartree Road crosses the village east to west and the site of a Roman villa, by a stream north-east of the crossroads, was excavated in 1946.

The manor of Glooston was recorded in the Domesday Book as being held by Hugh de Grentemesnil. From 1180 to the middle of the 14th century the Basset family of Drayton were mesne tenants. The manor was held of the Bassets by the Harington family, and from c. 1412-1422 held by the Brauncepath family, through the marriage of Margaret Harington to Richard Brauncepath. The manor passed to John Colly, a distant Harington relative, in 1480 after a protracted legal dispute. His descendant Anthony Colly put the manor in trust in 1587 to pay an annuity of £100 for 60 years to a skinner, Randall Manning of London. This payment was in arrears by 1592, and possession of the manor passed to Manning. In 1614 Colly redeemed it for £1,500, and in 1632 he sold it to the Brudenell family for £4,500, in whose possession it has remained.

By the 17th century half of the agricultural land in the parish (to the north of the village) was enclosed and laid down to pasture as sheep runs. To the south of the village were three open fields, Little Field, Burrough or Crosborough Field, and Willowsike Field. These were enclosed in 1828, with a total area of  being allotted. The lord of the manor, the Earl of Cardigan, who held the whole of the old enclosures, was allotted . The Rev. J. H. Dent of Hallaton, whose family held an estate in Glooston, was allotted . The Rector of Glooston was allotted  in lieu of tithes and glebe.

The parish church of St John the Baptist was rebuilt in 1866-67 by the architect Joseph Goddard of Leicester. Goddard appears to have retained the plan of the original church, whose fabric was mostly of 15th or 16th century date. It has an aisleless nave, chancel, south porch and a double bell-cote.

References

External links

OS Mapping of Glooston from Multimap
History of Glooston
Recent housing development, Glooston Park
Images of Glooston from Geograph
Old Barn Inn and Restaurant
Glooston Music Festival

Villages in Leicestershire
Civil parishes in Harborough District